Corrugation Corner is a technical rock climb at Lover's Leap near Lake Tahoe, CA first established in the 1960s. It is recognized for its high level of exposure as well as its pleasing aesthetics. Chris McNamara describes it as "one of the steepest granite 5.7s anywhere.".

Route description
Pitch 1: The climb ascends a large corner before continuing past a ceiling and into a second corner.
Pitch 2: It then ascends some cracks leading into a chimney, before traversing right onto a ledge.
Pitch 3: It ascends through another chimney, then traverses past a piton an onto an exposed arete.

References

External links
summitpost.org
supertopo.com
 rockclimbing.com

Climbing routes